The South Carolina Gamecocks women's track and field team represents the University of South Carolina and competes in the Southeastern Conference.  The team has been coached by Curtis Frye since 1997.  The facilities continue to be improved, including the recent addition of 1,450 seats at outdoor track & field facility.

Gamecocks in the Olympics
 Aliyah Abrams (2016, Guyana, 400 Metres)
 Aleen Bailey (2004 & 2008, Jamaica, 4 × 100 Metres Relay, 2004 Gold Medal)
 Miki Barber (2000, United States, 4 × 400 Metres Relay)
 Kierre Beckles (2016, Barbados, 400 Metres Hurdles)
 Lashinda Demus (2004 & 2012, United States, 400 Metres Hurdles, 2012 Silver Medal)
 Dawn Ellerbe (2000, United States, Hammer Throw)
 Michelle Fournier (2000 & 2004, Canada, Hammer Throw)
 Chelsea Hammond (2008, Jamaica, Long Jump)
 Natasha Hastings (2008, 2012 & 2016, United States, 4 × 400 Metres Relay, 2008 Gold Medal)
 Charmaine Howell (2000, Jamaica, 4 × 400 Metres Relay, Silver Medal)
 Mechelle Lewis (2008, United States, 4 × 100 Metres Relay)
 Lisa Misipeka (1996, 2000, & 2004, American Samoa, Hammer Throw & Shot Put)
 Jeanelle Scheper (2016, St. Lucia, High Jump)
 Shevon Stoddart (2004 & 2008, Jamaica, 400 Metres Hurdles)
 Tiffany Williams (2008, United States, 400 Metres Hurdles)
 Tonique Williams-Darling (2000 & 2004, The Bahamas, 400 Metres, 2004 Gold Medal)

Year-by-year results

References